The Šarplaninac is a breed of dog of livestock guardian type. It is named for the Šar Mountains or Šar Planina range in the Balkans, where it is principally found. Until 1957 it was known as the Illyrian Shepherd Dog or Ilirski Ovčar. 

In Ottoman times, the dogs moved with the flocks of sheep, spending the summer in the area of the Šar Mountains and the winter in Thessaly, where they were known as Greek Shepherd Dogs.

History 

The origins of the Šarplaninac are not known. It was traditionally used to guard cattle or sheep. In the transhumant system of management, livestock was moved twice a year, to the high mountain pastures for the summer, and to the warmer plains for the winter. In the southern Balkans, very large numbers of sheep were moved in this way, accompanied by men and dogs. In Ottoman times, dogs of this type moved with the flocks of sheep, spending the summer in the area of the Šar Mountains and the winter in Thessaly – where they were known as 'Greek Shepherd Dogs'. 

In 1939 it was recognised by the Fédération Cynologique Internationale as a Yugoslav breed with the name 'Ilirski Ovčar' or 'Illyrian Shepherd Dog'; In 1957, following a request from the Yugoslav Federation of Cynology (Jugoslovenski Kinološki Savez), the Fédération Cynologique Internationale agreed to change the official international names of the breed to 'Jugoslovenski Ovcarski Pas – Sarplaninac' and 'Yugoslavian Shepherd Dog – Sharplanina'. In 1968 the Kraški Ovčar or Karst Shepherd Dog, which had previously been considered a sub-type, was recognised as a separate breed.

Breed numbers were much reduced by the conflicts associated with the breakup of Yugoslavia in the 1990s. Following these events, the Fédération Cynologique Internationale recognised North Macedonia and Serbia as the countries of origin, although the Šar Mountains' range extends from southern Kosovo to northwestern North Macedonia.

The Šarplaninac is found mainly in the Šar Mountains, where it is thought to have originated and from which the name 'Šarplaninac' derives. It is also distributed in the areas of the Jablanica, Korab and Pelister mountains.

Characteristics 

The Šarplaninac is a large, strongly built dog. The body is slightly longer than the height at the withers, and the front legs account for approximately 55% of the height. The head is large but proportional to the body, with dark eyes.

It is a robust, well proportioned dog with plenty of bone, of a size that is well above the average and with a thick, long, rather coarse coat that emphasises the short coupled appearance.

It is always solid in colour: fawn, iron grey, white or almost black; usually sable or grey with darker "overalls" on the head and back, the undercoat being paler. The colour need not be completely uniform, and most Šarplaninac have several different shades of the same colour fading into one another.

Ban
Šarplaninac is on the list of banned dog breeds in Denmark. The Danish list includes 13 breeds and it is considered controversial having received criticism from dog owners and several political parties because eight of the 13 breeds have no reports of any incident. Among the eight is Šarplaninac.

Notes

References 

FCI breeds
Dog breeds originating in North Macedonia
Dog breeds originating in Serbia
Livestock guardian dogs